L'avaro (Italian for "the miser") may refer to:

 L'avaro (Anfossi), a 1775 opera by Pasquale Anfossi
 L'avaro or The Miser (1990 film)

See also
 L'Avare, French for The Miser, a 1668 play by Molière